David Michael Thissen (born c. 1950) is an emeritus professor of quantitative psychology at the University of North Carolina and former President of the Psychometric Society. He is a fellow at the American Statistical Association and the American Psychological Society. He is known for his contributions to item response theory.

Early life and education
The eldest of five children, Thissen graduated from St. Edmond High School in Fort Dodge, Iowa and was a national semifinalist in the 1967 Westinghouse Science Talent Search. He earned a bachelor's degree from Saint Louis University and a PhD in quantitative psychology from the University of Chicago, where he was awarded an NSF Graduate Research Fellowship.

Career
Upon receiving his PhD in 1976, Thissen joined the psychology faculty at the University of Kansas and was appointed an associate professor (with tenure) five years later. He moved to the University of North Carolina at Chapel Hill in 1990 as a full professor of psychology and served as the chair of the L. L. Thurstone Psychometric Laboratory until 2002. He continues to serve UNC as a full professor in the Department of Psychology and Neuroscience.

He is the author of hundreds of publications on testing and measurement, patient-reported health outcomes (PROs), human development, and statistical graphics. He published Test Scoring with Howard Wainer in 2001.

He has also developed numerous psychometric software programs including Multilog and IRTPRO.

Selected publications

References

External links 
 Vita at University of North Carolina at Chapel Hill

21st-century American psychologists
American statisticians
Psychometricians
University of North Carolina at Chapel Hill faculty
Living people
Fellows of the American Statistical Association
Year of birth missing (living people)
Quantitative psychologists